CGFC is an experimental performance art group from Reykjavík, Iceland. It was founded in 2015 by Arnar Geir Gústafsson, Ýr Jóhannsdóttir, Birnir Jón Sigurðsson and Hallveig Kristín Eiríksdóttir. Their work is driven by experiments with textiles and performance, and is often characterized by their use of recycled materials.

Background 

CGFC was originally formed as a punk band in 2015, but the group's work has since then expanded into theatre performance, live art, video and textile installations. Its core members are Hallveig Kristín Eiríksdóttir (performer and director), Arnar Geir Gústafsson (performer and sociologist), Ýr Jóhannsdóttir (textile designer and performer) and Birnir Jón Sigurðsson (performer and director), who have all been with the group from the start.

Their most notable production, in co-operation with the Reykjavík City Theatre, is Potatoes which was nominated for Gríman - The Icelandic Theatre Awards as Best Play in 2020. During the devising process, the group painted a portrait of Helga Gísladóttir, an unknown potato farmer, and donated it to the Icelandic Ministry of Industries and Innovation where it now hangs. The play was picked up by the National Broadcasting Company of Iceland and premiered as a three part radio drama on March 6, 2021.

CGFC has collaborated with electronic musician Halldór Eldjárn of the band Sykur.

Projects

References 

2015 establishments in Iceland
Reykjavík
Icelandic performance artists
Artist groups and collectives
21st-century textile artists